Halton Hills is a town in the Regional Municipality of Halton, located in the northwestern end of the Greater Toronto Area, Ontario, Canada with a population of 61,161 (2016).

There are many natural features within these bounds; they include the Niagara Escarpment, and the Bruce Trail. Many of these local features are protected by the Conservation Halton, Credit Valley Conservation & Grand River Conservation Authority.

Communities
The primary population centres are Georgetown and Acton. Additionally, there are a number of hamlets and rural clusters within the town, including Ashgrove, Ballinafad (straddling the boundary with Erin), Bannockburn, Crewsons Corners (straddling the boundary with Erin, Guelph-Eramosa and Milton), Glen Williams, Henderson's Corners, Hornby, Limehouse, Mansewood, Norval, Scotch Block, Silver Creek, Speyside, Stewarttown, Terra Cotta (straddling the boundary with Caledon), and Wildwood. The area was first settled in the 1820s.

Geography

Esquesing Township, of which the greatest part went to form Halton Hills, was favourably described in 1846:

The town is bisected by the Niagara Escarpment from southwest to northeast, and a significant portion of the rural area is located within the provincial Greenbelt. Above the Escarpment, a large proportion of the rural area is classified as environmentally sensitive wetlands, and there are several sites that are licensed for aggregate extraction, for which expansion requires detailed environmental assessment. Below the Escarpment, the rural area is mainly agricultural, with the exception of an industrial area currently being developed between Highway 401 and Steeles Avenue.

The town also forms part of three watersheds:

 to the west of Acton, a small area flows toward the Grand River
 the northern half flows into the Credit River, including the Black Creek and Silver Creek tributaries
 the southern half flows into the Sixteen Mile Creek

The Water Survey of Canada operates two hydrometric monitoring stations in the town, on the Black Creek below Acton, and at Norval on the Credit River.

Vegetation

Halton Hills is located in the transition zone between the Huron-Ontario Forest Section of the Great Lakes-St. Lawrence forest zone to the north and the Niagara Section of the Carolinian forest zone to the south. Both forest zones are part of the Mixedwood Plains Ecozone. The natural vegetation in the Huron-Ontario Section is dominated by mixed wood forests.  It is a transitional type between the southern deciduous forests and the northern coniferous forests. The forest communities of the Niagara Section are dominated by broad-leaved trees. Overall, Halton Hills consists predominantly of agricultural lands with scattered woodlands and wetlands. The woodlands are mainly deciduous forest and the wetlands are either cedar swamp or cattail marsh.

Endangered and threatened species

American ginseng exists in the town, and is protected under the Endangered Species Act, 2007. Butternut trees are also threatened by the butternut canker. The hooded warbler and the Jefferson salamander are also designated as threatened species.

Brook trout had been eliminated from the Black Creek watershed for many years, following the ongoing environmental disaster due to the excessive consumption of faecal mater as well as the trailer park polluting the water in the town of Erin. The trout have not returned, and anglers report that most of the fish have almost entirely disappeared from the area.

Geology

The physiography and distribution of surface material in the Town of Halton Hills are the result of glacial activity which took place in the Late Wisconsinan Substage of the Pleistocene Epoch. This period of time, which lasted from approximately 23,000 to 10,000 years ago, was marked by the repeated advance and melting back of massive, continental ice sheets.

The Niagara Escarpment dominates the physiography of the town and greatly influenced the pattern of glaciation in the region. The Escarpment, formed by erosion over millions of years, is a high relief bedrock scarp which trends to the north through the central part of the town. To the west, on the upper surface of the Escarpment, hummocky morainic ridges deposited by glacial ice form part of the Horseshoe Moraines physiographic region. To the southeast below the Escarpment, is a smooth glacial till plain partially bevelled by lacustrine action, which forms part of the South Slope and Peel Plain physiographic regions.

The Town of Halton Hills is underlain by Ordovician shales of the Queenston Formation east of the Niagara Escarpment, and by Silurian dolomites of the Amabel Formation west of the Escarpment. The escarpment face exposes a complex succession of shales, sandstones, limestones and dolomites of the Clinton and Cataract Groups. Red shales of the Queenston Formation underlie the eastern half of the town and are generally covered by more than 15 m of glacial sediments, predominantly the Halton Till. There are several areas of thin drift cover south of Georgetown.

The quarrying of limestone has been undertaken since the 19th century, and the lime industry was once quite prevalent. In 1886, the Toronto Lime Company had operations in Limehouse and Acton, employing a total of four draw kilns and eleven set kilns, producing common lime and water lime. At Limehouse, rock from the Clinton formation yielded green and brown shales and blue marl, which were used in the manufacture of mineral paints.

Small oil and gas deposits have been discovered northwest and south of Acton, and around Hornby. While exploration had occurred as early as 1908, with oil being discovered in 1912, significant strikes did not occur until 1954.

The town is located in an area that is considered to be of low seismic potential, and the largest recent earthquake to take place within its limits was of magnitude 3 on 29 June 1955. There is a POLARIS seismic monitoring station located just west of Acton.

Climate

Halton Hills has a humid continental climate (Köppen climate classification Dfb).

The Town has two distinct climate zones:
 Zone 5a - north of the Niagara Escarpment
 Zone 5b - south of the Escarpment

Environment Canada operates one climate monitoring station at Georgetown.

History 
Both Georgetown and Acton, as well as the smaller communities in the rural area, have histories which go back about 200 years. Settlement began in the 1820s.

Halton Hills was formed in 1974 through the amalgamation of the former Towns of Georgetown and Acton, together with much of the former Esquesing Township, and a small portion of the Town of Oakville lying north of Ontario Highway 401. Originally named the Town of North Halton in the establishing legislation, provision was made for a name change to be adopted in consequence of a referendum, and Halton Hills was thus chosen in October 1973:

On August 1, 2013, Toronto Premium Outlets, the first Premium Outlets Centre in Canada, opened for business on Steeles Avenue at the south end of Halton Hills near the border of Milton, Ontario.

Demographics

In 2021, Halton Hills was 84.6% white/European, 13.6% visible minorities, and 1.8% Indigenous. The largest visible minority groups were South Asian (5.6%), Black (1.7%), Chinese (1.2%), Filipino (1.0%) and Latin American (1.0%).

80.8% of residents spoke English as their mother tongue. The next most common first languages were Polish (1.7%), Portuguese (1.6%), French (1.5%), Punjabi (1.4%), Croatian (1.2%), Italian (1.0%) and Spanish (1.0%). 2.2% of residents listed both English and a non-official language as mother tongues, while 0.5% listed both English and French. 

61.4% of the population were Christian, down from 72.1% in 2011. 34.3% were Catholic, 16.8% were Protestant, 6.2% were Christian n.o.s, 1.6% were Christian Orthodox and 2.6% belonged to other Christian denominations or Christian-related traditions. 32.2% were non-religious or secular, up from 26.3% in 2011. 6.4% belonged to other religions, up from 1.6% in 2011.The largest non-Christian religions were Islam (2.0%), Sikhism (1.9%), and Hinduism (1.5%).

Local government

The town is divided into four wards, each of which elects two local councillors. Two regional councillors are also elected - one from Wards 1 and 2 (i.e., the area that was in the former Town of Acton and the former Township of Esquesing), and one from Wards 3 and 4 (i.e., the area in the former Town of Georgetown). The mayor is elected at large. The mayor and two regional councillors (who also serve on Halton Hills council) represent the town at the council meetings of the Regional Municipality of Halton.

The current (2022-2026) membership of the town council is as follows:

Halton Hills has its own fire department. However, policing is provided by the Halton Regional Police Services. The Town has its own official plan which came into force in March 2008 and was consolidated in 2017 with the Region's plan.  The libraries in the Town are managed by the Halton Hills Public Library Board.

Symbols

In 1975, the Lord Lyon King of Arms awarded arms to the town, followed by the grant of a badge in 1984. Both were subsequently registered with the Canadian Heraldic Authority in 2005. They are specifically described as follows:
 Arms: Per pale, dexter Or two bendlets wavy Sable, sinister Azure two escarpes wavy Argent, a chief per fess dancetty Azure and Argent, overall a white pine tree (Pinus strobus) proper;
 Motto: Hereditas Integritas Veritas
 Badge: On an oval Azure a white pine tree Argent within a wreath of five oak leaves alternating with five papyrus leaves Or.

Transportation

The town has four main roads:

East-west
   connecting Acton and Georgetown
  between Milton and Brampton

North-south
  between Acton and Milton
  between Ballinafad and Oakville

Bus service is provided by GO Transit along Highway 7 on its Georgetown line corridor. Via Rail and GO Train service are provided at Georgetown GO Station.

The Grand Trunk Railway brought train service to the area in 1856, with stations at Acton and Georgetown. Passenger service to Acton ceased in the 1990s, but GO Train service is planned to be revived there in 2013.

Rail freight service is also provided by Canadian National on its Halton Subdivision from Georgetown southwest through Milton to Burlington. CN's Guelph Subdivision between Georgetown and London is currently managed by Goderich–Exeter Railway.

In November 2020, VIA Rail Canada rerouted some of its trains onto the Halton Subdivision through Stewarttown while their usual route was closed for signal upgrades.

From 1917 to 1931, Norval, Georgetown and Acton were also served by the Toronto Suburban Railway.

Schools

Media

HaltonHillsToday.ca is an online local news source in Halton Hills, offering the latest breaking news, weather updates, entertainment, sports and business features, obituaries and more.

Halton Hills is also covered by the following local newspapers and online media:
 Georgetown Independent
 Acton Free Press
 The Acton New Tanner
 The Halton Compass
 Halton Herald
 In Georgetown Community Website
 Acton UP, local online news

A radio transmitter in Hornby is used by stations CFZM and CJBC.

See also
List of townships in Ontario

References

External links
 

 
Lower-tier municipalities in Ontario
Towns in Ontario
Lime kilns in Canada